Epacris serpyllifoliais a species of flowering plant in the heath family Ericaceae and is endemic to Tasmania. It is a small low-lying or weakly erect shrub with heart-shaped to broadly egg-shaped leaves and tube-shaped white flowers crowded in upper leaf axils.

Description
The petal tube is slightly longer than the sepals and the petal lobes are shorter than the petal tube, and the anthers sometimes slightly longer than the petal tube.

Taxonomy
Epacris serpyllifolia was first formally described in 1810 by Robert Brown in his Prodromus Florae Novae Hollandiae. The specific epithet (serpyllifolia) mean "wild thyme-leaved".

Distribution
This epacris is endemic to Tasmania where it is widespread and abundant in alpine and subalpine areas.

References

serpyllifolia
Taxa named by Robert Brown (botanist, born 1773)
Plants described in 1810
Flora of Tasmania